Hyphodermella is a genus of crust fungi in the family Phanerochaetaceae. It was circumscribed by mycologists John Eriksson and Leif Ryvarden in 1976.

Species
Hyphodermella brunneocontexta Duhem & Buyck (2011) – Mayotte
Hyphodermella corrugata (Fr.) J.Erikss. & Ryvarden (1976)
Hyphodermella densa Melo & Hjortstam (2003)
Hyphodermella maunakeaensis Gilb. & Hemmes (2001)
Hyphodermella ochracea (Bres.) Duhem (2010)
Hyphodermella poroides – China
Hyphodermella rosae (Bres.) Nakasone (2008)

References

Fungi described in 1976
Phanerochaetaceae
Polyporales genera
Taxa named by Leif Ryvarden